Anne Marie Blomstereng (born 12 July 1940 in Nordreisa) is a Norwegian politician for the Labour Party.

She served as a deputy representative to the Norwegian Parliament from Troms during the term 1989–1993.

On the local level Blomstereng served as deputy mayor of Nordreisa from 1983 to 1995.

References

1940 births
Living people
People from Nordreisa
Deputy members of the Storting
Labour Party (Norway) politicians
Troms politicians
Women members of the Storting